The Best American Poetry 1999, a volume in The Best American Poetry series, was edited by David Lehman and by guest editor John Hollander.

Poets and poems included

See also
 1998 in poetry

Notes

External links
 Web page for contents of the book, with links to each publication where the poems originally appeared

Best American Poetry series
1998 poetry books
American poetry anthologies